Lejman is a surname. Notable people with the surname include:

 Kazimierz Lejman (1907–1985), Polish dermatologist

See also
 Layman (surname)

Jewish surnames
Polish-language surnames
Slavic-language surnames
East Slavic-language surnames
Yiddish-language surnames